Meese was a four-piece rock band from Denver, Colorado, signed to Atlantic Records. The name "Meese" is taken from the last name of the band's founders and brothers, Patrick and Nathan Meese. The other two members of the band were Ben Haley and Mike Ayars.

In July 2009, the band released their first major studio album, Broadcast, which was received with warm reviews. The album's first single, "Next In Line", was offered as a free single of the week in the iTunes Store. In May 2010, Meese confirmed that they had disbanded.

Band members

 Patrick Meese  (lead vocals, keyboards, guitar and programming), 2004–2010
 Nathan Meese (guitar, keyboards, backing vocals), 2005–2010
 Mike Ayars (guitar, keyboards, backing vocals), 2006–2010
 Joe Richmond (drums), 2009–2010
 Jeff Davenport (bass), 2007–2010
 Ben Haley (drums), 2006–2009
 David Vanderhamm (bass), 2004–2007
 Ben Comerci (drums), 2004–2006

Discography
 The Oh No EP - 2005
 Our Album Year - 2006
 Winter Recordings EP - 2007 (iTunes release)
 The Start of It EP - 2008 
 Broadcast - 2009

References

External links
 
 Atlantic Records Artist Page

Alternative rock groups from Colorado
Indie rock musical groups from Colorado
Musical groups from Denver
2004 establishments in Colorado
Musical groups established in 2004